Forkhead box O6 is a protein that in humans is encoded by the FOXO6 gene.

FoxO6 is expressed in the liver, skeletal muscle, and the hippocampus of the brain. In the liver, FoxO6 normally promotes gluconeogenesis in the fasted state, but insulin blocks Fox06 upon feeding. In a condition of insulin resistance insulin fails to block FoxO6 resulting in continued gluconeogenesis even upon feeding.

References

Further reading 

 
 
 
 
 
 
 

Forkhead transcription factors